The 56th Filmfare Awards South ceremony honored its selection of the best South Indian films of 2008 and was held on Friday, 31 July 2009, in Hyderabad, India.

Nominations
The nominees for the 56th Filmfare Awards were announced live on Monday, 16 June 2009, at 12:00 a.m. IST (7:30 UTC) by Filmfare chief editors in Mumbai. The winners were announced during the awards ceremony scheduled to take place on 31 July 2009, in Hyderabad.

The Filmfare Best Film Award is given by the Filmfare magazine as part of its annual Filmfare Awards for Hindi films.

The award was first given in 1954. Here is a list of the award winners and the nominees of the respective years. Each individual entry shows the title followed by the production company, and the producer.

Multiple nominations and awards
The following films received multiple nominations.

Kannada

Nominations
 11 nominations: Gaalipata and Mussanjemaatu
 9 nominations: Moggina Manasu
 8 nominations: Taj Mahal

Awards
 5 awards: Moggina Manasu
 3 awards: Gaalipata
 2 awards: Mussanjemaatu

Malayalam

Nominations
 9 nominations: Thirakkatha
 6 nominations: Calcutta News and Mulla
 5 nominations: Gulmohar, Innathe Chintha Vishayam and Veruthe Oru Bhavya

Awards
 6 awards: Thirakkatha
 2 awards: Madambi

Tamil

Nominations
 8 nominations: Vaaranam Aayiram
 7 nominations: Subramaniyapuram and Yaaradi Nee Mohini
 6 nominations: Dasavathaaram
 4 nominations: Anjathe and Santosh Subramaniam

Awards
 5 awards: Vaaranam Aayiram
 3 awards: Subramaniyapuram

Telugu

Nominations
 7 nominations: Jalsa and Kotha Bangaru Lokam
 6 nominations: Gamyam
 4 nominations: Kantri, Parugu and Ready

Awards
 5 awards: Kotha Bangaru Lokam
 4 awards: Gamyam
 1 award: Ashta Chamma, Kantri and Parugu

Awardees
Winners in bold, nominees listed under.

Kannada cinema

Malayalam

Tamil

Telugu

Other awards
(No nominees for these awards)

Best Male Debutant: Shanthnoo Bhagyaraj – Sakkarakatti (Tamil)
Best Female Debutant: Meera Nandan – Mulla (Malayalam)
Best Choreographer: Prem Rakshith – Kantri (Telugu)
Best Cinematographer: S. Krishna – Haage Summane (Kannada); Chota K. Naidu – Kotha Bangaru Lokam (Telugu)
Lifetime Achievement Award: Veturi

See also
Filmfare Awards South
Filmfare Awards
2008 in film
International Tamil Film Awards
Tamil Nadu State Film Awards
Nandi Awards

References

External links
 
 
 56th Idea Filmfare Awards Nominations

Filmfare Awards South
Filmfare Awards South